Nolan James McLean (born July 24, 2001) is an American college baseball pitcher and third baseman for the Oklahoma State Cowboys.

Amateur career
McLean grew up in Willow Springs, North Carolina and attended Garner Magnet High School. McLean committed to play both baseball and football at Oklahoma State University.

McLean batted .263 with eight home runs and 20 RBIs and had a 0-1 record with a 18.00 ERA in two relief appearances as a pitcher for the Cowboys during his freshman season. He redshirted his freshman season on the football team before giving up the sport to focus solely on baseball. As a sophomore, McLean batted .285 with 19 home runs and struck out 39 batters in  innings pitched. McLean was selected in the third round of the 2022 Major League Baseball draft by the Baltimore Orioles. The Orioles drafted him as a pitcher. McLean ultimately did not sign with the team and returned to Oklahoma State for his junior season.

References

External links

Oklahoma State Cowboys football bio
Oklahoma State Cowboys baseball bio

2001 births
Living people
Baseball players from North Carolina
Baseball pitchers
Baseball third basemen
Oklahoma State Cowboys baseball players
Oklahoma State Cowboys football players